2001: A Space Odyssey, a science-fiction narrative.

2001: A Space Odyssey may also refer to:
 2001: A Space Odyssey (film)
 2001: A Space Odyssey (novel)
 2001: A Space Odyssey (comics)
 2001: A Space Odyssey (score)
 2001: A Space Odyssey (soundtrack)